Theodore Paul Budd (born October 21, 1971) is an American businessman and politician serving as the junior United States senator from North Carolina since 2023. His district covered the north-central part of the state.

Budd was the Republican nominee in the 2022 United States Senate election in North Carolina to replace retiring Republican senator Richard Burr. He defeated the Democratic nominee, Cheri Beasley, and subsequently took office on January 3, 2023.

Early life and career
Budd was born in Winston-Salem, North Carolina, in 1971. When he was young, his family moved to a  farm on the Yadkin River in Davie County, outside Advance, where they raise cattle and chickens. His father owned a facility-services company.

Budd attended Summit School, a private school in Winston-Salem, before attending Davie County High School, graduating in 1990. He then went to Appalachian State University, where received a bachelor of science in business administration in 1994. Budd later received a master of theology from the Dallas Theological Seminary in 1998 and a master of business administration from the Wake Forest University School of Business in 2007.

Budd owns a gun store in Rural Hall, North Carolina. The father of home-schooled children, he also served as a board member for North Carolinians for Home Education.

U.S. House of Representatives

Elections

2016 

Following court-mandated redistricting, the old 13th district essentially merged with the 2nd district. A new 13th district was created, stretching from the northern suburbs of Charlotte to Greensboro. The old 13th district's incumbent, Republican George Holding, opted to run in the 2nd district. Budd ran as one of 17 candidates in the ensuing Republican primary for the 13th district in the 2016 elections. His home had previously been in the 5th district but had been drawn into the 13th district.

With the help of the Club for Growth, which spent over $285,000 on his campaign, Budd won the primary with 20% of the vote. He defeated Bruce Davis, a former Guilford County commissioner, in the general election with 56.1% of the vote. He was sworn into office on January 3, 2017.

2018 

Budd was reelected in 2018, winning 51.5% to Kathy Manning's 45.8%. Manning was elected to represent the neighboring 6th district in 2020.

2020 

In 2020, Budd was reelected with 68.2% of the vote defeating Democrat Scott Huffman, who won 31.8% of the vote.

Tenure
In late February 2021, Budd and a dozen other Republican House members skipped votes and enlisted others to vote in their place, citing the ongoing COVID-19 pandemic. He and the other members were actually attending the Conservative Political Action Conference, which was held at the same time as their slated absences. In response, the Campaign for Accountability, an ethics watchdog group, filed a complaint with the House Committee on Ethics and requested an investigation into Budd and the other lawmakers.

Budd was a member of the Freedom Caucus.

Committee assignments 

 Committee on Financial Services
 Subcommittee on Consumer Protection and Financial Institutions
 Subcommittee on Diversity and Inclusion

Caucus memberships
Freedom Caucus
Republican Study Committee
Task Force on Artificial Intelligence

U.S. Senate

Elections

2022 

On April 23, 2021, Budd went to Mar-a-Lago to discuss his prospective U.S. Senate candidacy with former U.S. President Donald Trump. On April 28, 2021, Budd announced his candidacy for the Class 3 Senate seat held by the retiring Richard Burr. At the Republican state convention in Greenville on June 5, Budd received the endorsements of Donald Trump and Trump's daughter-in-law, Lara Trump, who had declined to run for the seat. Former North Carolina Governor Pat McCrory said he would remain in the race despite Trump's endorsement. A third declared candidate, U.S. Representative Mark Walker, said he too would stay in the race, maintaining that he had won a straw poll of those attending the convention.

Budd won the Republican primary on May 17, 2022, with 58% of the vote, to McCrory's 25% and Walker's 9%. In the general election, Budd defeated Democratic nominee Cheri Beasley, the former chief justice of the North Carolina Supreme Court. Budd received 50.5% of the vote to Beasley's 47.3%—a margin of 3.2%.

Senate tenure 
At the convening of the 118th Congress on January 3, 2023, Budd was sworn in as North Carolina's junior U.S. Senator. He was one of five new Republican senators to take office that day.

In March 2023, Budd introduced the Seeing Objects at Altitude Regularly Act (SOAR), co-sponsored by Senator Mark Kelly, legislation that would require the Federal Aviation Administration to issue regulations within two years mandating equipping high-altitude balloons operating at 10,000 feet above sea level or higher with tracking systems to transmit location, altitude, and identity. The idea for the bill came after a Chinese-operated balloon crossed over the U.S. the previous month.

Committee assignments
Committee on Armed Services
Subcommittee on Cybersecurity
Subcommittee on Emerging Threats and Capabilities
 Subcommittee on Personnel
Committee on Health, Education, Labor and Pensions
Subcommittee on Employment and Workplace Safety
Subcommittee on Primary Health and Retirement Security
Committee on Commerce, Science, and Transportation
Subcommittee on Communications, Media, and Broadband
Subcommittee on Consumer Protection, Product Safety, and Data Security
Subcommittee on Surface Transportation, Maritime, Freight, and Ports
Committee on Small Business and Entrepreneurship
Caucuses
Senate Republican Conference

Political positions

Abortion 
After Senator Lindsey Graham introduced legislation that would ban abortion nationwide after 15 weeks of pregnancy, Budd co-sponsored a House version of the bill with over 80 Republicans.

Affordable Care Act 
Budd opposes the Affordable Care Act and voted to repeal it in 2017.

2020 presidential election 
In December 2020, Budd was one of 126 Republican members of the House of Representatives to sign an amicus brief in support of Texas v. Pennsylvania, a lawsuit filed by Texas Attorney General Ken Paxton at the United States Supreme Court. It contested the results of the 2020 presidential election, in four states, Georgia, Michigan, Pennsylvania, and Wisconsin, where Joe Biden defeated incumbent Donald Trump. The Supreme Court declined to hear the case on the basis that Texas lacked standing under Article III of the Constitution to challenge the results of an election held by other states.

On January 6, 2021, Budd was one of 147 Republican lawmakers who objected to the certification of electoral votes from the 2020 presidential election after a mob of Trump supporters stormed the U.S. Capitol, forcing an emergency recess of Congress. Budd contended that officials in Pennsylvania had acted "illegally" and "violated" both the United States Constitution and that of their own state. He said, "I cannot consent to accepting Pennsylvania's electoral votes."

Voting rights and election integrity 
Budd opposes the For the People Act, a Democratic bill intended to expand voting rights. Budd said that the bill undermines election integrity by expanding "no excuse" absentee voting and weakening voter ID requirements. He said that the bill would allow minors to vote. PolitiFact ruled this claim false, as the bill would only allow those under 18 to register to vote. Amendments to the bill that would lower the voting age to 16 failed in both 2019 and 2021.

Foreign policy 
In 2020, Budd voted against the National Defense Authorization Act of 2021, which would prevent the president from withdrawing soldiers from Afghanistan without congressional approval.

In 2021, Budd was one of 14 Republican representatives to vote against a measure condemning the 2021 Myanmar coup d'état.

Antitrust bill 
In 2022, Budd was one of 39 Republicans to vote for the Merger Filing Fee Modernization Act of 2021, an antitrust package that would crack down on corporations for anti-competitive behavior.

Personal life
Budd met his wife, Amy Kate Adams, on a mission to the Soviet Union in 1991. They married in 1994 and have three children. The Budds live in Davie County on the farm where Budd was raised. They home-school their children and Budd serves as an assistant scoutmaster in his son's Boy Scout troop.

The Budds, led by his father, Richard Budd, loaned $10 million to AgriBioTech, which was repaid with over $25,000 in interest. The company later declared bankruptcy.

References

External links

 Senator Ted Budd official U.S. Senate website
Campaign website

 
 Budd Biography at Ballotpedia
 budd/index.html Collected news and commentary at The New York Times
 -->
 

|-

|-

|-

|-

1971 births
21st-century American politicians
American gun rights activists
American Protestant missionaries
Appalachian State University alumni
Businesspeople from North Carolina
Living people
People from Davie County, North Carolina
Protestant missionaries in Russia
Republican Party members of the United States House of Representatives from North Carolina
Republican Party United States senators from North Carolina
Wake Forest University alumni
Christians from North Carolina
American evangelicals